Platyptilia profunda is a moth of the family Pterophoridae. It is known from Honshu island of Japan.

The length of the forewings is 11–14 mm.

The larvae feed on Senecio nemorensis.

External links
Taxonomic and Biological Studies of Pterophoridae of Japan (Lepidoptera)
Japanese Moths

profunda
Endemic fauna of Japan
Moths of Japan
Moths described in 1963